Jordan Burt (born August 19, 1990) is an American former soccer player who previously played as a fullback for Colorado Springs Switchbacks in the USL Championship.

Career

Youth and college
Burt played five years of college soccer at Butler University between 2009 and 2013.

While at college, Burt appeared for various USL PDL clubs, including Indiana Invaders, Rochester Thunder, Southern California Seahorses, Washington Crossfire and Real Colorado Foxes.

Professional
Burt signed with North American Soccer League club Carolina RailHawks on April 15, 2014.

Burt signed with the USL’s Colorado Springs Switchbacks in 2015 as a member of the inaugural roster. He quickly became a mainstay of the starting lineup, making 21 starts over 27 appearances in his debut season.

Burt continued to help lead the Switchbacks, scoring a combined fourteen goals in the 2017 and 2018 seasons, while earning multiple USL Team of the Week selections.

Ahead of the 2019 season, Burt was named team captain in recognition of his achievements on the field as well as his leadership in the locker room. He went on to score seven goals in 32 total starts.

As of his re-signing in 2020, he is the only player remaining with Switchbacks from the club’s inaugural squad. He has made the most appearances in club history with 155 and is three goals shy of the franchise record for most goals with the club in all competitions with 27.

References

External links 

 

1990 births
Living people
American soccer players
Association football midfielders
Butler Bulldogs men's soccer players
Colorado Springs Switchbacks FC players
Indiana Invaders players
North American Soccer League players
North Carolina FC players
People from Elkhart, Indiana
Real Colorado Foxes players
Rochester Thunder players
Soccer players from Indiana
Southern California Seahorses players
USL Championship players
USL League Two players
Washington Crossfire players